

Upton Park F.C.
The Upton Park team included a number of guest players from other clubs.

USFSA XI

Université de Bruxelles

References

RSSSF
IFFHS archive

1900 Summer Olympics
Football at the 1900 Summer Olympics